The 1977 Grand Prix d'Automne was the 71st edition of the Paris–Tours cycle race and was held on 25 September 1977. The race started in Tours and finished in Versailles. The race was won by Joop Zoetemelk.

General classification

References

1977 in French sport
1977
1977 Super Prestige Pernod